Majestic Film Company, also known as Majestic Motion Pictures, was a film  studio established in 1911. It became an affiliate of the Mutual Film Corporation and was combined with Reliance Film Company to form Reliance-Majestic Studios.

If was formed by Harry Aitken drawing on managerial talent from Independent Moving Pictures (IMP) as well as pulling over young star Mary Pickford. Thomas Cochrane was a general manager. Wallace Reid was one of the company's directors.

Mary Pickford was one of its actresses. She left for Biograph in 1912. Donald Crisp directed several Majestic films.

Filmography
The Courting of Mary (1911)
Love Heeds Not the Showers (1911)
Little Red Riding Hood (1911 film) (1911)
The Caddy's Dream (1911)
Honor Thy Father (1912)
The Pajama Parade (1913)
The Second Mrs. Roebuck (1914)
A Mother's Influence (1914)
The Niggard (1914)
Moonshine Molly (1914)
Little Country Mouse (1914), extant
The Intruder (1914)
For Her Father's Sins (1914)
For Those Unborn (1914)
The City Beautiful (1914)
Arms and the Gringo (1914)
Another Chance (1914)
At Dawn (1914), directed by Donald Crisp
Her Shattered Idol (1915)

References

1911 establishments in California
Entertainment companies established in 1911
Mass media companies established in 1911
Film studios in Southern California
Defunct American film studios
Silent film studios
Defunct organizations based in Hollywood, Los Angeles
Entertainment companies based in California
Companies based in Los Angeles
Defunct companies based in Greater Los Angeles
Film production companies of the United States